The Lighthouse in Glasgow is Scotland's Centre for Design and Architecture. It was opened as part of Glasgow's status as UK City of Architecture and Design in 1999.

The Lighthouse is the renamed conversion of the former offices of the Glasgow Herald newspaper. Completed in 1895, it was designed by the architect Charles Rennie Mackintosh. The centre's vision is to develop the links between design, architecture, and the creative industries, seeing these as interconnected social, educational, economic and cultural issues of concern to everyone.

The Lighthouse today
The Lighthouse Trust went into administration in August 2009. At its peak the Lighthouse Trust employed around 90 staff. Its directors moved on: Nick Barley became director of the Edinburgh International Book Festival. Following a substantial redundancy programme the remaining staff were transferred to Architecture and Design Scotland (A+DS) and Glasgow City Council (GCC). The Lighthouse building remains in the ownership of Glasgow City Council, which has made financial provision to meet the costs of operating the centre, re-establishing it as Scotland's National Centre for Architecture and Design.

A Steering Group – made up of representatives of Glasgow City Council, Glasgow School Of Art, Scottish Enterprise, Creative Scotland, and various independent architects and designers – has now implemented a range of permanent and temporary uses within the building including a conference/events programme, catering facilities, temporary and permanent exhibitions, a limited amount of business space, and a design shop (TOJO) on the ground floor. Architecture and Design Scotland (A+DS) now occupy one of five floors of the building and continue to run a range of programmes on that floor. The remaining staff were awarded extended contracts of employment with GCC.

Views of Glasgow
One of the key features of the Lighthouse is the uninterrupted view over Glasgow's cityscape available from the Mackintosh Tower at the north of the building, which is accessible via a helical staircase from the third floor.

There is also another modern viewing platform at the south of the building, on the sixth floor and is only accessible via lift.

City of architecture and design
In 1999, the Clydesdale Bank issued a £20 note to mark Glasgow's celebrations as UK City of Architecture and Design which featured an illustration of the Lighthouse building and the dome of Thomson's Holmwood House on the reverse. The obverse side carried a portrait of Glaswegian architect Alexander "Greek" Thomson.

See also
Culture in Glasgow

References

External links
Official website
The Lighthouse - Illustrated Guide

Category A listed buildings in Glasgow
Culture in Glasgow
Architecture museums in the United Kingdom
Architecture in Scotland
Scottish design
Art museums established in 1999
Museums in Glasgow
1999 establishments in Scotland
Art Nouveau architecture in Glasgow
Art Nouveau commercial buildings
Commercial buildings completed in 1895
Charles Rennie Mackintosh buildings